Western Chongqing University (渝西学院) is a public university located in Chongqing, China. It is a full-time public undergraduate college covering science, engineering, economics, management, law, literature and art.

History 
The university was created in 2005 from the merger of two higher education institutions. They were the Chongqing Normal Academy (重庆师范高等专科学校) which was founded in 1956 and the Chongqing Teaching College (渝州教育学院) established in 1972.

Administration 
The university is organized into the following departments.

Department Structure 
Department of Literature and Communication
Department of Foreign Languages 
Department of Law and Political Science
Department of Economic Management
Education Department
Department of Mathematics and Computer Science
Department of Physics and Information Engineering
Department of Chemistry and Environmental Science
Biology Department
Music Department
Department of Physical Education
Department of Fine Arts 
Department of College English Teaching
School of Applied Science and Technology
School of Adult Education
Training School

References

External links 
Western Chongqing University

Universities and colleges in Chongqing
Educational institutions established in 2005
2005 establishments in China